The Baker Bobcat and the follow-on Baker Supercat are American homebuilt aircraft that were designed by Bobby Baker.

Design and development
The Baker Supercat is a low-wing, strut-braced, open cockpit, conventional landing gear-equipped aircraft with all-wooden construction. The aircraft was originally designed to be an ultralight aircraft and the wings are removable. In 1994 Bowdler Aviation purchased the rights to the plans.

Operational history
In 1994, an enclosed Supercat with a modified NACA 4415 airfoil and an inverted  Rotax 503 installation engine was awarded Grand Champion Light Plane at the EAA AirVenture Oshkosh airshow.

Variants
Baker Bobcat
Ultralight version powered by a KFM 107 engine and without wing struts
Baker Supercat
Development version

Specifications (Baker Supercat)

See also

References

External links
YouTube Video

Homebuilt aircraft
Single-engined tractor aircraft
Low-wing aircraft